This page details the match results and statistics of the New Zealand national football team from 1970 until 1999.

Key

Key to matches
Att. = Match attendance
(H) = Home ground
(A) = Away ground
(N) = Neutral ground

Key to record by opponent
Pld = Games played
W = Games won
D = Games drawn
L = Games lost
GF = Goals for
GA = Goals against

A-International results
New Zealand's score is shown first in each case.

Notes

Best/worst results
New Zealand's best, worst, and highest scoring results from 1970 to 1999.

Streaks
Most wins in a row
7, 31 August 1958–4 June 1962
7, 1 October 1978–8 October 1979
6, 30 September 1951–16 September 1952
Most matches without a loss
11, 25 April 1981–7 September 1981
10, 30 March 1977–21 February 1980
9, 30 September 1951–14 August 1954
9, 18 October 1984–26 October 1985
Most draws in a row
2, 4 March 1973–11 March 1973
2, 5 November 1975–9 November 1975
2, 21 October 1980–24 October 1980
2, 28 November 1981–14 December 1981
2, 28 June 1995–10 November 1995
2, 16 June 1999–18 June 1999
Most losses in a row
16, 23 July 1927–19 September 1951
7, 15 July 1999–21 January 2000
Most matches without a win
16, 23 July 1927–19 September 1951
9, 9 June 1995–28 June 1996
9, 10 July 1999–23 January 2000

Results by opposition

Results by year

Cumulative table includes all results prior to 1970.

See also
New Zealand national football team
New Zealand at the FIFA World Cup
New Zealand at the FIFA Confederations Cup
New Zealand at the OFC Nations Cup

References

1970–99